The Protocol on Prohibitions or Restrictions on the Use of Mines, Booby-Traps and Other Devices is a United Nations treaty that restricts the use of land mines, remotely delivered mines, and booby traps. It is Protocol II to the 1980 Convention on Certain Conventional Weapons.

Content
The Protocol prohibits the use of land mines, remotely delivered mines, or booby traps to kill civilians or to cause superfluous injury or unnecessary suffering to soldiers. It also prohibits the use of booby traps that are "attached to or associated with" any of the following features: (a) internationally recognized protective emblems, signs or signals; (b) sick, wounded or dead persons; (c) burial or cremation sites or graves; (d) medical facilities, medical equipment, medical supplies or medical transportation; (e) children's toys or other portable objects or products specially designed for the feeding, health, hygiene, clothing or education of children; (f) food or drink; (g) kitchen utensils or appliances except in military establishments, military locations or military supply depots; (h) objects clearly of a religious nature; (i) historic monuments, works of art or places of worship which constitute the cultural or spiritual heritage of peoples; and (j) animals or their carcasses.

The Protocol applies to both international and internal armed conflicts. It prohibits the use of non-detectable anti-personnel mines and their transfer; prohibits the use of non-self-destructing and non-self-deactivating mines outside fenced, monitored and marked areas; broadens obligations of protection in favour of peacekeeping and other missions of the United Nations and its agencies; requires States to enforce compliance with its provisions within their jurisdiction; and calls for penal sanctions in case of violation.

History
The original Protocol was an annex to the 1980 Convention on Certain Conventional Weapons and entered into force on 2 December 1983. The Protocol was amended in Geneva on 3 May 1996. The amended version entered into force on 3 December 1998 and as of October 2020 has 106 state parties, which includes 105 United Nations member states plus the Holy See.

External links
1996 (amended) Protocol
1996 (amended) Protocol
State parties (amended)

1996 in Switzerland
Arms control treaties
Treaties concluded in 1980
Treaties entered into force in 1983
Treaties concluded in 1996
Treaties entered into force in 1998
International humanitarian law treaties
United Nations treaties
Protocol
Treaties of Albania
Treaties of Argentina
Treaties of Australia
Treaties of Austria
Treaties of Bangladesh
Treaties of the Byelorussian Soviet Socialist Republic
Treaties of Belgium
Treaties of Bolivia
Treaties of Bosnia and Herzegovina
Treaties of Brazil
Treaties of the People's Republic of Bulgaria
Treaties of Burkina Faso
Treaties of Cambodia
Treaties of Cameroon
Treaties of Canada
Treaties of Cape Verde
Treaties of Chile
Treaties of the People's Republic of China
Treaties of Colombia
Treaties of Costa Rica
Treaties of Croatia
Treaties of Cyprus
Treaties of the Czech Republic
Treaties of Denmark
Treaties of the Dominican Republic
Treaties of Ecuador
Treaties of El Salvador
Treaties of Estonia
Treaties of Finland
Treaties of France
Treaties of Gabon
Treaties of Georgia (country)
Treaties of Germany
Treaties of Greece
Treaties of Grenada
Treaties of Guatemala
Treaties of Guinea-Bissau
Treaties of the Holy See
Treaties of Honduras
Treaties of the Hungarian People's Republic
Treaties of Iceland
Treaties of Iraq
Treaties of India
Treaties of Ireland
Treaties of Israel
Treaties of Italy
Treaties of Jamaica
Treaties of Japan
Treaties of Jordan
Treaties of Kuwait
Treaties of Latvia
Treaties of Liberia
Treaties of Liechtenstein
Treaties of Lithuania
Treaties of Luxembourg
Treaties of Madagascar
Treaties of the Maldives
Treaties of Mali
Treaties of Malta
Treaties of Monaco
Treaties of Montenegro
Treaties of Morocco
Treaties of Nauru
Treaties of the Netherlands
Treaties of New Zealand
Treaties of Nicaragua
Treaties of Niger
Treaties of Norway
Treaties of Pakistan
Treaties of Panama
Treaties of Paraguay
Treaties of Peru
Treaties of the Philippines
Treaties of the Polish People's Republic
Treaties of Portugal
Treaties of South Korea
Treaties of Moldova
Treaties of Romania
Treaties of the Soviet Union
Treaties of Senegal
Treaties of Serbia and Montenegro
Treaties of Seychelles
Treaties of Sierra Leone
Treaties of Slovakia
Treaties of Slovenia
Treaties of South Africa
Treaties of Spain
Treaties of Sri Lanka
Treaties of Saint Vincent and the Grenadines
Treaties of Sweden
Treaties of Switzerland
Treaties of Tajikistan
Treaties of North Macedonia
Treaties of Tunisia
Treaties of Turkey
Treaties of Turkmenistan
Treaties of the Ukrainian Soviet Socialist Republic
Treaties of the United Kingdom
Treaties of the United States
Treaties of Uruguay
Treaties of Venezuela
Treaties of Zambia
Treaties extended to the Faroe Islands
Treaties extended to Greenland
Convention on Certain Conventional Weapons
Treaties extended to the Caribbean Netherlands
Treaties of Mauritius